Caspar Neher (born Rudolf Ludwig Caspar Neher; 11 April 1897 – 30 June 1962) was an Austrian-German scenographer and librettist, known principally for his career-long working relationship with Bertolt Brecht.

Neher was born in Augsburg. He and Brecht were school friends who were separated for a time by the First World War, during which Neher was awarded the Iron Cross, Second Class (on 2 February 1918). In 1919, he studied under Angelo Jank at the Academy of Fine Arts, Munich. He was first engaged professionally by the Munich Kammerspiele in 1922, although his designs for its production of Brecht's Drums in the Night were rejected. On 18 August 1923, Neher married Erika Tornquist in Graz. Their son, Georg, was born on 14 October 1924. In autumn of 1926, Neher became the staff designer at the Berlin Staatstheater. A year later, he became head of design at the Grillo-Theater in Essen, Germany, where he designed 8 operas and 11 plays. He died in Vienna.

Scenographic work
(All plays by Bertolt Brecht unless otherwise stated.)
 1923. Das Käthchen von Heilbronn by Heinrich von Kleist at the Berlin Staatstheater; dir. Jürgen Fehling
 1923. In the Jungle at the Residenztheater in Munich
 1924. The Life of Edward II of England at the Munich Kammerspiele; dir. Brecht
 1924. Jungle: Decline of a Family at the Deutsches Theater in Berlin; dir. Erich Engel
 1925. Coriolanus by William Shakespeare at the Lessing-Theater in Berlin; dir. Erich Engel
 1925. Circle of Chalk in a version by Klabund at the Deutsches Theater; dir. Max Reinhardt
 1926. Lysistrata by Aristophanes at the Deutsches Theater; dir. Erich Engel
 1926. Baal at the Deutsches Theater in Berlin
 1926. Man Equals Man at the Landestheater Darmstadt; dir. Jacob Geis
 1926. Earth Spirit and Pandora's Box by Frank Wedekind at the Berlin Staatstheater; dir. Erich Engel
 1927. The Little Mahagonny at the Deutsche Kammermusik Festival at Baden-Baden; dir. Brecht
 1927. Die Wupper by Else Lasker-Schüler at the Berlin Staatstheater; dir. Carl Ebert
 1928. Man Equals Man at the Berlin Volksbühne; dir. Erich Engel
 1928. Kalkutta, 4. Mai by Lion Feuchtwanger at the Berlin Staatstheater; dir. Erich Engel
 1928. The Threepenny Opera at the Theater am Schiffbauerdamm in Berlin, music by Kurt Weill
 1928. Carmen by Georges Bizet at the Kroll Opera House in Berlin
 1929. Pioneers in Ingolstadt by Marieluise Fleißer at the Theater am Schiffbauerdamm in Berlin; dir. Brecht and Jacob Geis
 1929. Moritat, Moschopoulos, and Sganarelle by Rudolf Wagner-Régeny at the Grillo-Theater, Essen
 1929. Wozzeck by Alban Berg
 1930. Walter Brugmann
 1931. Man Equals Man at the Berlin Staatstheater; dir. Brecht
 1931. The Threepenny Opera, costume design for the cinematic adaptation directed by Georg Wilhelm Pabst
 1931. From the House of the Dead by Leoš Janáček at the Kroll Opera House in Berlin
 1932. Die Bürgschaft, libretto and design by Neher, music by Kurt Weill, at the Deutsche Oper Berlin; dir. Ebert
 1932. Un ballo in maschera by Giuseppe Verdi at the Deutsche Oper Berlin; dir. Ebert
 1932. Rise and Fall of the City of Mahagonny at the Salle Gaveau in Paris; dir. Hans Curjel
 1932. Oliver Cromwells Sendung by Walter Gilbricht at the Volksbühne; dir. Hilpert
 1938. Macbeth by Giuseppe Verdi at the Glyndebourne Festival Opera; dir. Ebert
 1949. Un ballo in maschera by Giuseppe Verdi for the Glyndebourne Festival Opera at the Edinburgh Festival; dir. Ebert
 1949. Mr Puntila and his Man Matti at the Berliner Ensemble in East Berlin.

References

Sources
 Sacks, Glendyr. 1994. "A Brecht Calendar." In The Cambridge Companion to Brecht. Ed. Peter Thomson and Glendyr Sacks. Cambridge Companions to Literature Ser. Cambridge: Cambridge University Press. . p. xvii–xxvii.
 Willett, John. 1967. The Theatre of Bertolt Brecht: A Study from Eight Aspects. Third rev. ed. London: Methuen, 1977. .
 Willett, John. 1986. Caspar Neher: Brecht's Designer. London and New York: Methuen. .

1897 births
1962 deaths
Writers from Augsburg
German scenic designers
Opera designers
Academy of Fine Arts, Munich alumni